Callum Black (born 25 February 1986) is an American-born Irish former rugby union player for Worcester Warriors in the English Premiership. He plays as a loosehead prop.

Black was born in Washington, D.C. in the United States, and raised in England where he attended Hartpury College. He joined the Worcester Warriors academy straight from College and joined the senior squad towards the end of the 2008–09 season. He enjoyed loan spells at both Otley and Plymouth during his time with the Worcester Warriors. He joined Ulster for the 2011/12 season. On 8 February 2018, Black resigned for Worcester Warriors back in the Aviva Premiership from the 2018-19 season.

Black is Irish-qualified through his paternal grandfather, who was originally from Belfast.  Black has represented Ireland at the Under 18, Under 19 and Under 21 levels. Black is also eligible to play for the United States, where he was born. Black was named to the USA Eagles' roster for the 2018 mid-year tests.

On 8 June 2021, Black announced his retirement from professional rugby at the end of the 2020-21 season.

References

External links
 Worcester Warriors profile

1986 births
Living people
Worcester Warriors players
Ulster Rugby players
Irish Exiles rugby union players
American rugby union players
Alumni of Hartpury College
Rugby union props